The Southeast Peninsula is a peninsula of Sulawesi (Celebes), lying between the Gulf of Tolo and the Gulf of Boni. It is mostly coterminous with the province of Southeast Sulawesi. The largest city on the peninsula is Kendari.

Several islands are situated off its south-eastern tip, including Muna and Buton.

See also
 East, South, and Minahassa Peninsulas

References

Peninsulas of Sulawesi
Landforms of Southeast Sulawesi